is a Japanese footballer currently playing as a defensive midfielder for Tochigi SC, on loan from Yokohama F. Marinos.

Career statistics

Club
.

Notes

References

External links

2002 births
Living people
Sportspeople from Kanagawa Prefecture
Association football people from Kanagawa Prefecture
Japanese footballers
Association football midfielders
Yokohama F. Marinos players
Tochigi SC players